Mister Scoutmaster is a 1953 comedy film about Boy Scouts, starring Clifton Webb. It is based on the book Be Prepared by Keith Monroe, writing under the pseudonym Rice E. Cochran.

Plot
An arrogant, aloof television personality gets more than he bargained for when he consents to be leader to a troop of Boy Scouts. The sponsor of Robert Jordan's (Clifton Webb) TV program says he might cancel the show because Jordan appeals only to a middle-aged following and is out of touch with a younger audience.

Jordan takes his troubles home to wife Helen (Frances Dee), who wants a child of her own. When he learns that Helen has donated a favorite suit to a Boy Scout clothing drive, Jordan goes to retrieve it, but is flabbergasted when 8-year-old Mike Marshall (George Winslow) insists he pay full price for it.

The boy returns the money, impressing the Jordans. When the couple pursue adoption through the local church, Rev. Dr. Stone (Edmund Gwenn) mentions that the Scout troop is in need of a new scoutmaster. Jordan sees it as a chance to find out more about children, but is appalled by their rowdy behavior. Mike is too young to be a Scout, but persists in joining every activity.

Jordan discovers that Mike is an orphan who tries to hide the fact that he lives with an irresponsible aunt in the city's waterfront district. Mike comes to the Scoutmaster's rescue in the woods when Jordan gets trapped inside a sleeping bag at the bottom of a ravine. The Jordans decide to adopt the boy, and Robert's television show is continued.

Cast
 Clifton Webb as Robert Jordan
 Frances Dee as Helen
 Edmund Gwenn as Dr. Stone
 George Winslow as the Boy (Mike)
 Veda Ann Borg as Blonde
 Orley Lindgren as Ace
 Jimmy Hawkins as Herbie Weber
 Jimmy Moss as Vernon Swanson
 Sammy Ogg as Harold Johnson
 Skip Torgerson as Christy Kerns
 Lee Aaker as Arthur
 Mickey Little as Chick
 Jon Gardner as Larry
 Sarah Selby as Mrs. Weber
 Amanda Randolph as Savannah, the Maid

Further reading

References

External links
 
 
 

1953 comedy films
1953 films
20th Century Fox films
American comedy films
Films shot in Los Angeles
American black-and-white films
Films based on American novels
Films scored by Cyril J. Mockridge
Films about the Boy Scouts of America
Films directed by Henry Levin
1950s English-language films
1950s American films